Gail Grandchamp (born March 13, 1955) is a retired American female boxer. On 16 April 1992, after eight years in court litigation in Massachusetts, she gained the right to  become a boxer, as a state Superior Court judge deemed it was illegal to deny someone a chance to box based on gender. During her efforts to gain the right to box as an amateur, she passed the age of 36, the maximum age for amateur fighters. She instead pursued a career as professional boxer.

Professional boxing record

References

External links
 Official site

1955 births
Boxers from Massachusetts
Living people
People from North Adams, Massachusetts
American women boxers
Lightweight boxers
21st-century American women
Sportspeople from Berkshire County, Massachusetts